Guerriero (Italian, 'warrior') is a surname. Notable people with the surname include:

 Aristide Guerriero (1986), Italian former shot putter
 Jason Guerriero (1981), American ice hockey coach
 Leila Guerriero (1967), Argentine journalist and writer
 Luciano Guerriero, Italian physicist
 Ludovic Guerriero (1985), French former professional footballer
 Patrick Guerriero (1968), former Massachusetts state legislator, mayor, and advocate for marriage equality
 Roger Guerriero (1982), Polish footballer

Italian-language surnames
Surnames from nicknames